Albínovská hora, sometimes also Albínovská hôrka (translated to English as Albinov Hill or Albinov Mountain, in local dialect Baňa—Mine from Hungarian Bánya) is a hill located on the west part of Sub-Slanec Hills, division of Eastern Slovak Hills, in eastern Slovakia.

Remains of Tertiary volcanic activity in the area (see Slanské Hills) is andesite and characteristic tuff, covered under layers by Neogene sedimentary rocks – gravel, sand, kaolin etc.

Footnotes 

Mountains of Slovakia